In camera design, a focal-plane shutter (FPS) is a type of photographic shutter that is positioned immediately in front of the focal plane of the camera, that is, right in front of the photographic film or image sensor.

Two-curtain shutters 
The traditional type of focal-plane shutter in 35 mm cameras, pioneered by Leitz for use in its Leica cameras, uses two shutter curtains, made of opaque rubberised fabric, that run horizontally across the film plane. For slower shutter speeds, the first curtain opens (usually) from right to left, and after the required time with the shutter open, the second curtain closes the aperture in the same direction. When the shutter is cocked again the shutter curtains are moved back to their starting positions, ready to be released.

Focal-plane shutter at low speed

Figure 1: The black rectangle represents the frame aperture through which the exposure is made. It is currently covered by the first shutter curtain, shown in red. The second shutter curtain shown in green is on the right side.

Figure 2: The first shutter curtain moves fully to the left allowing the exposure to be made. At this point, the flash is made to fire if one is attached and ready to do so.

Figure 3: After the required amount of exposure the second shutter curtain moves to the left to cover the frame aperture. When the shutter is recocked the shutter curtains are wound back to the right-hand side ready for the next exposure.

This is a graphical representation only; the actual mechanisms are much more complex. For example, the shutter curtains actually roll on and off spools at either side of the frame aperture so as to use as little space as possible.

Faster shutter speeds are achieved by the second curtain closing before the first one has fully opened; this results in a vertical slit that travels horizontally across the film. Faster shutter speeds simply require a narrower slit, as the speed of travel of the shutter curtains is not normally varied.

Focal-plane shutter at high speed

Figure 1: The black rectangle represents the frame aperture through which the exposure is made. It is currently covered by the first shutter curtain, shown in red. The second shutter curtain shown in green is on the right side.

Figure 2: The first shutter curtain begins to move to the left allowing the exposure to be made. Because the exposure requires a very fast shutter speed, the second curtain begins to move across at a set distance from the first one.

Figure 3: The first shutter curtain continues to travel across the frame aperture followed by the second curtain. It would be pointless to use an electronic flash with this shutter speed as the short duration flash would expose only a very small amount of the frame as the rest is covered by either the first or second shutter curtain.

Figure 4: The first shutter curtain finishes moving, followed closely by the second curtain which is now covering the frame aperture completely. When the shutter is recocked both shutter curtains are wound back to the right-hand side ready for the next exposure.

Vertical-travel shutters 

Most modern 35 mm and digital SLR cameras now use vertical travel metal blade shutters. These work in precisely the same way as the horizontal shutters, but because of the shorter distance the shutter blades must travel (24 mm as opposed to 36 mm), the shutter blades can travel across the film plane in less time. This can result in faster flash synchronization speeds than are possible with the horizontal-curtain focal-plane shutter, and the shutter can reliably provide higher speeds (up to 1/12000 of a second).

Advantages 
One of the advantages of focal-plane shutters is that the shutter can be built into the body of a camera that accepts interchangeable lenses, eliminating the need for each lens to have a central shutter built into it.

Another advantage of the focal-plane shutter is that their fastest speeds are quite high: 1/4000 second, 1/8000 second, or even 1/12000 second; much higher than the 1/500 second of the typical leaf shutter. (See The Square-type metal-bladed focal-plane shutter and The quest for higher speed, below.)

Disadvantages 

The main disadvantage of the focal-plane shutter is that a durable and reliable one is a complex (and often expensive) device. While the concept of a travelling slit shutter is simple, a modern FP shutter is a computerised microsecond accurate timer, governing sub-gram masses of exotic materials, subjected to hundreds of gs acceleration, moving with micron precision, choreographed with other camera systems for 100,000+ cycles. This is why FP shutters are seldom seen in compact or point-and-shoot cameras.

In addition, the typical focal-plane shutter has flash synchronization speeds that are slower than the typical leaf shutter's 1/500 s, because the first curtain has to open fully and the second curtain must not start to close until the flash has fired. In other words, the very narrow slits of fast speeds will not be properly flash exposed. The fastest X-sync speed on a 35 mm camera is traditionally 1/60 s for horizontal Leica-type FP shutters and 1/125 s for vertical Square-type FP shutters. Modern FP shutters have increased X-sync to 1/300 s with the use of exotic ultra-strong materials and computer control, and 1/8000 s through electronic sleight of hand. (See The quest for higher speed and Breaking the X-sync barrier, below.)

Focal-plane shutters may also produce image distortion of very fast-moving objects or when panned rapidly, as described in the Rolling shutter article. A large relative difference between a slow wipe speed and a narrow curtain slit results in cartoonish distortion, because one side of the frame is exposed at a noticeably later instant than the other and the object's interim movement is imaged.

For a horizontal Leica-type FP shutter, the image is stretched if the object moves in the same direction as the shutter curtains, and compressed if travelling in the opposite direction of them. For a downward-firing vertical Square-type FP shutter, the top of the image leans forward. In fact, the use of leaning to give the impression of speed in illustration is a caricature of the distortion caused by the slow wiping vertical FP shutters of large format cameras from the first half of the 20th century.

Electro-optical shutters 
Instead of using relatively slow-moving mechanical shutter curtains, electro-optic devices such as Pockels cells can be employed as shutters. While not commonly used, they completely avoid the problems associated with travelling-curtain shutters such as flash synchronisation limitations and image distortions when the object is moving. Such shutters are significantly more costly than mechanical shutters.

Rotary focal-plane shutter 
Besides the horizontal Leica and vertical Square FP shutters, other types of FP shutters exist. The most prominent is the rotary or sector FP shutter. The rotary disc shutter is common in film movie cameras, but rare in still cameras. These spin a round metal plate with a sector cutout in front of the film. In theory, rotary shutters can control their speeds by narrowing or widening the sector cutout (by using two overlapping plates and varying the overlap) and/or by spinning the plate faster or slower. However, for simplicity's sake, most still camera rotary shutters have fixed cutouts and vary the spinning speed. The Olympus Pen F and Pen FT (1963 and 1966, both from Japan) half frame 35 mm SLRs spun a semicircular titanium plate to 1/500 s.

Semicircular rotary shutters also have the advantage of unlimited X-sync speed, but all rotary FP shutters have the disadvantage of the bulk required for the plate spin. The Univex Mercury (1938, US) half frame 35 mm camera had a very large dome protruding out the top of the main body to accommodate its 1/1000 s rotary shutter. They also produce very unusual distortion at very high speed because of the angular sweep of the exposure wipe. Bulk can be reduced by substituting blade sheaves for the plate, but then the rotary FP shutter essentially becomes a regular bladed FP shutter.

Revolving drum focal-plane shutter 

The revolving drum is an unusual FP shutter that has been used in several specialised panoramic cameras such as the Panon Widelux (1959, Japan) and KMZ Horizont (1968, Soviet Union). Instead of using an extremely short focal length (wide-angle) lens to achieve an extra-wide field of view, these cameras have a medium-wide lens encapsulated in a drum with a rear vertical slit. As the entire drum is horizontally pivoted on the lens's rear nodal point, the slit wipes an extra-wide-aspect image onto film held against a curved focal plane. The Widelux produced a 140° wide image in a 24×59 mm frame on 135 film with a Lux 26 mm f/2.8 lens and controlled shutter speed by varying rotation speed on a fixed slit width.

In the Kodak Cirkut (1907, US) and Globus Globuscope (1981, US) cameras, the entire camera and lens revolved as the film was pulled past the slit in the opposite direction. The Globuscope produced a 360° angle of view image in a 24×160 mm frame on 135 film with a 25 mm lens and had adjustable slit width with a constant rotation speed.

Revolving FP shutters produce images with unusual distortion where the image center seems to bulge toward the viewer, while the periphery appears to curve away because the lens's field of view changes as it swivels. This distortion will disappear if the photograph is mounted on a circularly curved support and viewed with the eye at the center. Revolving shutters must also rotate smoothly; otherwise, uneven exposure will result in ugly vertical banding in the image. Since the rotation may take several seconds to complete, no matter the shutter speed, the camera should be tripod mounted. For the same reason, flash cannot be used with these cameras.

These cameras are often used for photographing large groups of people (e.g. the 'school' photograph). For this purpose, the subjects are arranged in a shortened semicircle with the camera at the centre such that all the subjects are the same distance from the camera and facing the camera. Once the exposure is made and processed, the panoramic print shows everyone in a straight line facing in the same direction. The distortion present in the background betrays the technique.

History and technical development 
The earliest daguerreotype (invented 1839) photographic cameras did not have shutters, because the lack of sensitivity of the process and the small apertures of available lenses meant that exposure times were measured in many minutes. A photographer could easily control exposure time by removing and returning the camera lens' lens cap or plug.

However, during the 19th century, as one increased-sensitivity process replaced another, and larger apertures lenses became available, exposure times shortened to seconds and then to fractions of seconds. Exposure timing control mechanisms became a necessary accessory and then a standard camera feature.

Single-curtain focal-plane shutter 
The earliest manufactured shutter was the drop shutter of the 1870s. This was an accessory guillotine-like device – a wooden panel with slit cutout mounted on rails in front of the camera lens that gravity dropped at a controlled rate. As the slit passed the lens, it "wiped" the exposure onto the photographic plate. With rubber bands to increase the drop speed, a 1/500 or 1/1000 s shutter speed could be reached. Eadweard Muybridge used shutters of this type in his famous trotting horse studies.

By the 1880s, lens front mounted accessory shutter boxes were available, containing a rubberised silk cloth curtain (also called a blind) with one or more width slit cutouts wound around two parallel drums and using springs to pull a slit from one drum to the other. These shutters offered a wide range of shutter speeds by adjusting the spring tension and selecting a slit width.

In 1883, Ottomar Anschütz (Germany) patented a camera with an internal roller blind shutter mechanism, just in front of the photographic plate. Thus the focal-plane shutter in modern recognizable form was born. Goerz manufactured the Anschütz Camera (Germany) as the first production FP shutter camera in 1890. Francis Blake invented a type of focal plane shutter camera by 1889 that achieved shutter speeds of 1/2000 second, and exhibited numerous stop-action photographs. Note that a drop shutter-like mechanism with adjustable slit was used at the focal plane of an apparently one-off William England camera in 1861 and this is considered the first FP shutter of any kind.

Single curtain, vertical travelling, fixed-width slit, focal-plane shutters with adjustable spring tension and slit-width selection remained popular in large and medium format cameras for the next half-century. The lens on a single curtain FP shutter camera must have its lens cap on when the shutter is cocked; otherwise the film will be double exposed when the blind's cutout re-passes the film gate. A camera-mounted FP shutter's main advantage over the competing interlens leaf shutter was ability to use a very narrow slit to offer an action stopping 1/1000 second shutter speed at a time when leaf shutters topped out at 1/250 s – although the available contemporaneous ISO 1 to 3 equivalent speed emulsions limited the opportunities to use the high speeds.

However, these older focal-plane shutters wiped the exposure fairly slowly, even under the highest available spring tension, because the delicate curtain was too fragile to survive the necessary accelerative shocks to move faster. The large relative difference between a slow downward wipe speed and a narrow curtain slit resulted in cartoonish distortion of very fast moving objects instead of truly freezing their motion. (See Section 4: "Disadvantages", above.)

Folmer and Schwing (US) was the most famous proponent of single curtain FP shutters, with their large format sheet film Graflex single-lens reflex and Graphic press cameras using them from 1905 to 1973.

Leica-type dual-curtain focal-plane shutter 

In 1925, the Leica A (Germany) 35 mm camera was introduced with a dual-cloth-curtain, horizontal-travelling-slit, focal-plane shutter. A dual curtain FP shutter does not have precut slits and the spring tension is not adjustable. The exposure slit is formed by drawing open the first curtain onto one drum and then pulling closed the second curtain off a second drum after a clockwork escapement timed delay (imagine two overlapping window shades) and moves at one speed (technically the curtains are still accelerating slightly) across film gate. Faster shutter speeds are provided by timing the second shutter curtain to close sooner after the first curtain opens and narrowing the slit wiping the film (see schematic figures above). Dual curtain FP shutters are self-capping; the curtains are designed to overlap as the shutter is cocked to prevent double exposure.

Although self-capping dual curtain FP shutters date back to the late 19th century, the Leica design made them popular and virtually all FP shutters introduced since 1925 are dual curtain models. As perfected in the 1954 Leica M3 (West Germany), a typical Leica-type horizontal FP shutter for 35 mm cameras is pre-tensioned to traverse the 36 millimeter wide film gate in 18 milliseconds (at 2 meters per second) and supports slit widths for a speed range of 1 to 1/1000 s. A minimum 2 mm wide slit produces a maximum 1/1000 s effective shutter speed. Note that the dual curtain FP shutter suffers the same fast speed distortion problems as the single curtain type. Similar technology FP shutters were also common in medium format 120 roll film cameras.

Horizontal cloth FP shutters are normally limited to 1/1000 s maximum speed because of the difficulties in precisely timing extremely narrow slits and the unacceptable distortion resulting from a relatively slow wipe speed. Their maximum flash synchronization speed is also limited because the slit is fully open only to the film gate (36 mm wide or wider) and able to be flash exposed up to 1/60 s X-synchronization (nominal; 18 ms = 1/55 s actual maximum; in reality, a 40 mm slit to allow for variance gives 1/50 s ⅓ stop slow). (See Section 4: "Disadvantages", above.)

Some horizontal FP shutters managed to exceed these limits by narrowing the slit or increasing curtain velocity beyond the norm. However, these tended to be sophisticated ultra-high precision models used in expensive professional-level cameras. The first such shutter was to be found in the Konica F, released in February 1960. Called the Hi-Synchro, this shutter reached the speed of 1/2000s and made possible flash synchronization at 1/125s.

Square-type metal-bladed focal-plane shutter 
In 1960, the Konica F (Japan) 35 mm SLR began a long term incremental increase in maximum shutter speeds with its "High Synchro" FP shutter. This shutter greatly improved efficiency over the typical Leica shutter by using stronger metal blade sheaves that were "fanned" much faster, vertically along the minor axis of the 24×36 mm frame. As perfected in 1965 by Copal, the Copal Square's slit traversed the 24 mm high film gate in 7 ms (3.4 m/s). This doubled flash X-sync speed to 1/125 s. In addition, a minimum 1.7 mm wide slit would double top shutter speed to a maximum 1/2000 s. Note, most Squares were derated to 1/1000 s in the interest of reliability.

The Square's metal blades were also immune to the drying out, rotting and pinholing that cloth curtained shutters could suffer from as they aged. In addition, Squares came from the supplier as complete drop-in modules, so camera designers could concentrate on camera design and leave shutter design to specialist subcontractors. This had previously been an advantage of leaf shutters.

Square-type FP shutters were originally bulky in size and noisy in operation, limiting their popularity in the 1960s among camera designers and photographers. Although Konica and Nikkormat and Topcon (D-1) were major users of the Copal Square, many other brands including Asahi Pentax, Canon, Leica and Minolta continued to refine the Leica-type shutter for reliability, if not speed; moving from three axis to four axis designs (one control axis for each curtain drum axis, instead of one control for both drums).

New compact and quieter Square designs, with simpler construction and greater reliability, were introduced in the 1970s. The most notable were the Copal Compact Shutter (CCS), introduced by the Konica Autoreflex TC (1976), and the Seiko Metal Focal-Plane Compact (MFC), first used in the Pentax ME (1977; all from Japan). The vertical blade type supplanted the horizontal cloth type as the dominant FP shutter type in the 1980s. Even Leica Camera (originally E. Leitz), long a champion of the horizontal cloth FP shutter for its quietness, switched to a vertical metal FP shutter in 2006 for its first digital rangefinder (RF) camera, the Leica M8 (Germany).

Note that the Contax (Germany) 35 mm RF camera of 1932 had a vertical travel FP shutter with dual brass-slatted roller blinds with adjustable spring tension and slit width, and a top speed of 1/1000 s (the Contax II of 1936 had a claimed 1/1250 s top speed), but it was woefully unreliable and not an antecedent of the modern Square shutter.

Quest for higher speed 
Although the Square shutter improved the FP shutter in most ways, it still limited maximum flash X-sync speed to 1/125 s (unless using special long-burn FP flash bulbs that burn throughout the slit wipe, making slit width irrelevant.). Any quality leaf shutter of the 1960s could achieve at least 1/500 s flash sync. Greater FP shutter X-sync speed would require further strengthening the curtains, by using exotic materials, allowing them to move even faster and widen the slits.

Copal collaborated with Nippon Kogaku to improve the Compact Square shutter for the Nikon FM2 (Japan) of 1982 by using honeycomb pattern etched titanium foil, stronger and lighter than plain stainless steel, for its blade sheaves. This permitted cutting shutter-curtain travel time by nearly half to 3.6 ms (at 6.7 m/s) and allowed 1/200 s flash X-sync speed. A bonus was a distortionless top speed of 1/4000 s (with 1.7 mm slit). The Nikon FE2 (Japan), with an improved version of this shutter, had a 3.3 ms (at 7.3 m/s) curtain travel time and boosted X-sync speed to 1/250 s in 1983. The top speed remained 1/4000 s (with 1.8 mm slit).

The fastest focal-plane shutter ever used in a film camera was the 1.8 ms curtain travel time (at 13.3 m/s) duralumin and carbon fiber bladed one introduced by the Minolta Maxxum 9xi (named Dynax 9xi in Europe, α-9xi in Japan) in 1992. It provided a maximum 1/12,000 s (with 1.1 mm slit) and 1/300 s X-sync.

Electronically controlled focal-plane shutter 
A parallel development to faster speed FP shutters was electronic shutter control as part of the general trend of electronic governance of all camera systems. In 1966, the VEB Pentacon Praktica electronic (East Germany) was the first SLR with an electronically controlled FP shutter. It used electronic circuitry to time its shutter instead of the traditional spring/gear/lever clockwork mechanisms. In 1971, the Asahi Pentax Electro Spotmatic (Japan; name shortened to Asahi Pentax ES in 1972; called Honeywell Pentax ES in US) tied its electronically controlled shutter to its exposure control light meter to provide electronic aperture-priority autoexposure.

The traditional 1/1000 s and 1/2000 s top speeds of horizontal and vertical FP shutters are on the knife's edge of mechanical controllability – often  stop too slow, even in ultra-high-quality models. Spring powered geartrains become inadequate to durably control and reliably time any higher accelerations and shocks. For example, some highly tensioned FP shutters could suffer from "shutter curtain bounce". This phenomenon is exactly what it sounds like – if the curtains are not properly braked after crossing the film gate, they might crash and bounce; reopening the shutter and causing double exposure ghosting bands on the image edge. Even the Nikon F2's ultra-high precision shutter suffered from this as an early production teething problem. As the Square-type FP shutter's blades moved faster and faster to provide shorter and shorter shutter speeds, the need for better blade timing control only increased.

At first, electromagnets controlled by analogue resistor/capacitor timers were used to govern the release of the second shutter curtain (though still operated by spring power). In 1979, the Yashica Contax 139 Quartz (Japan) introduced more precise digital piezoelectric quartz (shortly followed by ceramic) oscillator circuits (ultimately under digital microprocessor control) to time and sequence its entire exposure cycle – including its vertical FP shutter. Electric "coreless" micromotors, with near instantaneous on/off capability and very high power for their size, would drive both curtains (and other camera systems), replacing springs altogether, in the late 1980s. Minimizing mechanical moving parts also helped to prevent inertial shock vibration problems.

Electronic control also made it simpler to time very long shutter speeds. A spring-wound clockwork escapement must completely unwind fairly quickly and limit the longest speed – generally to one full second, although the Kine Exakta (Germany) offered 12 s in 1936. The Olympus OM-2's electronically timed horizontal FP shutter could reach 60 s in 1975 and the Olympus OM-4 (both Japan) reached 240 s in 1983. The Pentax LX (Japan, 1980) and Canon New F-1 (Japan, 1981) even had hybrid electromechanical FP shutters that timed their fast speeds mechanically, but used electronics only to extend the slow speed range; the LX to 125 s, the F-1N to a modest 8 s. Note, the Nikon F4 (Japan, 1989) was specified to reach a timed shutter speed of 999 hours with the use of the accessory electronic Multi Control Back MF-23. In theory, the longest available speed is limited only by available battery power for the electronics. This caught some 1970s photographers by surprise when they attempted very long "B" exposures and found their camera batteries had died in the middle because of the era's power hungry electronics and ruined the exposure.

Breaking the X-sync barrier 
Electronics are also responsible for pushing the focal-plane shutter's X-sync speed beyond its mechanical limits. As stated earlier, a horizontal FP shutter for 35 mm cameras is fully open and usable only for flash exposure up to 1/60 s, while vertical FP shutters are usually limited to 1/125 s. At higher speeds, a normal 1 millisecond electronic flash burst would expose only the part open to the slit. (See Sections 4: "Disadvantages", and 7.2 "The Leica-type dual curtain focal-plane shutter", above.)

In 1986, the Olympus OM-4T (Japan) introduced a system that could synchronize a specially dedicated accessory Olympus F280 Full Synchro electronic flash to pulse its light at a 20 kilohertz rate for up to 40 ms, to illuminate its horizontal FP shutter's slit as it crossed the entire film gate – in effect, simulating long-burn FP flashbulbs – allowing flash exposure at shutter speeds as fast as 1/2000 s. This allowed daylight plus fill-flash use in almost any situation. However, there is a concomitant loss of flash range. They are still offered in some digital-SLRs to 1/8000 s. Leaf shutter cameras are not affected by this issue – they have completely different limitations.

Focal-plane shutters today 
Focal-plane shutter top speed peaked at 1/16,000 s (and 1/500 s X-sync) in 1999 with the Nikon D1 digital SLR. The D1 used electronic assist from its sensor for the 1/16,000 s speed and its 15.6×23.7 mm "APS-size" sensor was smaller than 35 mm film and therefore easier to cross quickly for 1/500 s X-sync.

However, with very limited need for such extremely fast speeds, FP shutters retreated to 1/8000 s in 2003 (and 1/250 s X-sync in 2006) – even in professional level cameras. In addition, since no specialised timers are needed for extremely slow speeds, the slowest speed setting is usually 30 s.

Instead, over the last twenty years, most effort has gone into improving durability and reliability. Whereas the best mechanically controlled shutters were rated for 150,000 cycles and had an accuracy of ±¼ stop from nominal value (more typically 50,000 cycles at ±½ stop), today's best electronically controlled FP shutters can last 300,000 cycles and have no noticeable speed error.

In last few years, digital point-and-shoot cameras have been using timed electronic sampling of the image sensor, replacing the traditional mechanical leaf shutter, with delicate moving parts that can wear out, used by film-based point-and-shoot units. Something similar is now also occurring with more sophisticated digital cameras that, in the past, would have used focal-plane shutters. For example, the Panasonic Lumix DMC-G3 (2011, Japan) interchangeable lens digital camera has an FP shutter, but in its 20 frames per second SH Burst mode, it locks its mechanical shutter open and electronically scans its digital sensor, although with resolution reduced to 4 megapixels from 16 MP.

References 

Photographic shutters

eo:Obturatoro#Fokus-ebena obturatoro